Cryptotermes bengalensis, is a species of dry wood termite of the genus Cryptotermes. It is native to India, Bangladesh, Thailand and introduced to Sri Lanka. It is found in dead and rotten wood of Ficus species. It is a pest of Diospyros insignis.

References

External links
On the occurrence of Cryptotermes bengalensis Snyder in Guyarat, India
Termite Fauna of Assam Region, Eastern India

Termites
Insects described in 1934
Endemic fauna of Bangladesh